Burretiodendron hsienmu is a species of flowering plant in the family Malvaceae. It is found in Vietnam and China. It is threatened by habitat loss.

Description
The wood taken from a Burretiodendron hsienmu tree is very hard, tough and durable. It has grain and would not suffer from termite infestation if buried in the ground for a long period of time. Because of its great properties, ethnic minorities on the high rocky area (mainly the Tay people and Nung people) use the wood to make the columns, floors, etc. of the stilt house. The boards are so flexible that walking on them does not produce the slightest noise. Another popular item to make from Burretiodendron hsienmu wood are cutting boards.

The downside of furniture made from this species' wood is that the influence of moisture and water can easily bend, wrap or even break thin boards.

The duramen has a uniform dark brown with fine, but easily distinguishable grains and delicate flower pattern on the surface of the steel as the Japanese sword when shaved (not all trees have this property). Rain water can only fade the outermost layer of the wood. The sapwood is lighter in color, softer and weightless than the heartwood. It is prized as a material to make the altar, furniture, etc.

References

hsienmu
Trees of China
Trees of Vietnam
Vulnerable plants
Taxonomy articles created by Polbot